Dr. Jamuna Prasad Saroj is an Indian politician and a member of 17th Legislative Assembly of Soraon, Uttar Pradesh of India. He represents the Soraon constituency of Uttar Pradesh and is a member of the Apna Dal (Sonelal) party.

Political career
Dr. jamuna Prasad saroj has been a member of the 17th Legislative Assembly of Uttar Pradesh. Since 2017, he has represented the Soraon constituency and is a member of the AD(S).

Posts held

See also
Uttar Pradesh Legislative Assembly

References

Uttar Pradesh MLAs 2017–2022
Apna Dal (Sonelal) politicians
Living people
Year of birth missing (living people)